Estádio Nacional da Tundavala is a multi-use stadium in Lubango, Huíla Province, Angola.  Completed in 2010, it is used mostly for football matches and will host some events for the 2010 African Cup of Nations. The stadium has a capacity of 20,000 people.

The stadium is also often used by the Football Club Desportivo Da Huila as their home ground for the Professional football league in Angola, called Girabola.

References

External links
Venue information 
Stadium information
Photographs of the Stadium

Football venues in Angola
2010 Africa Cup of Nations